The 2018–19 Tour de Ski was the 13th edition of the Tour de Ski and part of the 2018–19 FIS Cross-Country World Cup. The World Cup stage event began in Toblach, Italy on 29 December 2018 and concluded with the Final Climb stage in Val di Fiemme, Italy, on 6 January 2019. The tour was the first tour starting in Toblach. The overall tours were won for the first time by Ingvild Flugstad Østberg (Norway) and Johannes Høsflot Klæbo (Norway).

The opening stage was won by Stina Nilsson of Sweden and Johannes Høsflot Klæbo of Norway. Natalya Nepryayeva won the women's second stage and took over the lead in the overall standings. The men's second stage was won by Sergey Ustiugov, with fellow Russian Alexander Bolshunov taking over the leader's blue bib. The third stage was the second and last sprint race of the tour, again won by Nilsson and Klæbo. Klæbo's second victory of his Tour de Ski debut put him in the blue bib which he held for the rest of the tour. Jessie Diggins of the United States skied the fourth stage in the blue bib, but four consecutive wins on the four last stages for Norwegian Ingvild Flugstad Østberg made her the overall winner of the tour, with a record winning margin of 2 minutes 42 seconds. Klæbo won four of the seven stages and won the overall Tour de Ski on his first attempt. 22 years and 76 days old, Klæbo became the youngest ever winner of the overall standings.

Schedule

Overall leadership 

Two main individual competitions were contested in the 2018–19 Tour de Ski, as well as a team competition. The most important was the overall standings, calculated by adding each rider's finishing times on each stage. The skiers collect bonus seconds due to their finishing positions in every stage apart from the Final Climb. In the sprint stages, the winners were awarded 60 bonus seconds, while on distance stages the top three finishers would get 15, 10 and 5 seconds respectively. In mass start races, time bonuses were awarded to the ten first skiers to cross the intermediate sprint points. The skier with the lowest cumulative time would be the overall winner of the Tour de Ski. The skier leading the overall standings would wear a blue bib.

The second competition was the sprint standings. The skiers who received the highest number of bonus seconds during the Tour would win the sprint standings. The bonus seconds available for each stage finish were determined by the stage's type. The leader was identified by a grey bib.

The final competition was a team competition. This was calculated using the finishing times of the best two skiers of both genders per team on each stage; the leading team was the team with the lowest cumulative time.

A total of CHF 560,000, both genders included, was awarded in cash prizes in the race. The overall winners of the Tour de Ski received CHF 55,000, with the second and third placed skiers getting CHF 40,000 and CHF 27,500 respectively. All finishers in the top 20 were awarded money. The holders of the overall and sprint standings would benefit on each stage they led; the final winners of the sprint standings would be given CHF 6,000. CHF 3,000 was given to the winners of each stage of the race, with smaller amounts given to places 2 and 3.

Men
 In stages two and four Richard Jouve, who was second in the sprint standings, wore the grey bib, because first placed Johannes Høsflot Klæbo wore the blue bib as the leader of the overall standings.
 In stage five Sindre Bjørnestad Skar, who was third in the sprint standings, wore the grey bib, because first placed Klæbo wore the blue bib as the leader of the overall standings and second placed Emil Iversen withdrew after the fourth stage.
 In stage six and seven Alexander Bolshunov, who was second in the sprint standings, wore the grey bib, because first placed Klæbo wore the blue bib as the leader of the overall standings.
Women
 In stage two Ida Ingemarsdotter, who was second in the sprint standings, wore the grey bib, because first placed Stina Nilsson wore the blue bib as the leader of the overall standings.
 In stage five Jessie Diggins, who was second in the sprint standings, wore the grey bib, because first placed Nilsson withdrew after the fourth stage.
 In stages six and seven Diggins, who was second in the sprint standings, wore the grey bib, because first placed Ingvild Flugstad Østberg wore the blue bib as leader of the overall standings.

Final standings

Overall standings

Sprint standings

Team standings

Stages

Stage 1
29 December 2018, Toblach, Italy
 Bonus seconds to the 30 skiers that qualifies for the quarter-finals, distributed as following:
 Final: 60–54–48–46–44–42
 Semi-final: 32–30–28–26–24–22
 Quarter-final: 10–10–10–8–8–8–8–8–6–6–6–6–6–4–4–4–4–4

Stage 2
30 December 2018, Toblach, Italy
 Bonus seconds in finish: 15–10–5 to the 3 fastest skiers.

Stage 3
1 January 2019, Val Müstair, Switzerland
 Bonus seconds to the 30 skiers that qualifies for the quarter-finals, distributed as following:
 Final: 60–54–48–46–44–42
 Semi-final: 32–30–28–26–24–22
 Quarter-final: 10–10–10–8–8–8–8–8–6–6–6–6–6–4–4–4–4–4

Stage 4
2 January 2019, Oberstdorf, Germany

Stage 4 bonus seconds
 Men: 2 intermediate sprints, bonus seconds to the 10 first skiers (15–12–10–8–6–5–4–3–2–1) past the intermediate points.
 Ladies: 1 intermediate sprint, bonus seconds to the 10 first skiers (15–12–10–8–6–5–4–3–2–1) past the intermediate point.
 Bonus seconds in finish: 15–10–5 to the 3 first skiers crossing the finish line.

Stage 5
3 January 2019, Oberstdorf, Germany
 Bonus seconds in finish: 15–10–5 to the 3 first skiers crossing the finish line.

Stage 6
5 January 2019, Val di Fiemme, Italy

Stage 6 bonus seconds
 Men: 2 intermediate sprints, bonus seconds to the 10 first skiers (15–12–10–8–6–5–4–3–2–1) past the intermediate points.
 Ladies: 1 intermediate sprint, bonus seconds to the 10 first skiers (15–12–10–8–6–5–4–3–2–1) past the intermediate point.
 Bonus seconds in finish: 15–10–5 to the 3 first skiers crossing the finish line.

Stage 7
6 January 2019, Val di Fiemme, Italy

The race for "Fastest of the Day" counts for 2018–19 FIS Cross-Country World Cup points. No bonus seconds were awarded on this stage.

References

Sources

 

 
2018–19 FIS Cross-Country World Cup
2018 19
2018 in cross-country skiing
2018 in Italian sport
2019 in German sport
2019 in Swiss sport
2019 in Italian sport
2019 in cross-country skiing
December 2018 sports events in Europe
January 2019 sports events in Europe